Manticora is a Danish heavy metal band from Hvidovre formed in 1996 by Lars and Kristian Larsen. Their current label is Nightmare Records. Their lyrical content typically consists of literature, fantasy, and science fiction. Although they are considered to be a progressive power metal band, they do have an essence of a speed metal influence. Their newest album, To Live to Kill to Live, was released on 28 August 2020 via ViciSolum Productions.

Band members
 Lars F. Larsen – vocals (1996–present)
 Kristian Larsen – guitar (1996–present)
 Kasper Gram – bass (2001–2013, 2019–present)
 Stefan Johansson – guitar (2014–present)
 Lawrence Dinamarca – drums (2017–present)

Former members
 Mads Volf – drums (1996–2016)
 Rene Nielsen – bass (1996–2001)
 Flemming Schultz – guitar (1998–2001)
 Jeppe Eg Jensen – keyboards (1998–2003)
 Martin Arendal – guitar (2001–2013)
 Sebastian Andersen – bass (2014–2019)

Timeline

Discography
Dead End Solution EP (1997)
Roots of Eternity (1999)
Darkness with Tales to Tell (2001)
Hyperion (2002)
8 Deadly Sins (2004)
The Black Circus Part 1: Letters (2006)
The Black Circus Part 2: Disclosure (2007)
Safe (2010)
To Kill to Live to Kill (2018)
To Live to Kill to Live (2020)

References

External links
Official website
Manticora on Myspace

Danish progressive metal musical groups
Danish power metal musical groups
Danish heavy metal musical groups
Musical groups established in 1996
1996 establishments in Denmark
Scarlet Records artists
People from Hvidovre Municipality